Lalitpur Patriots is a professional cricket franchise team based in Lalitpur, Nepal which participates in the Everest Premier League. Founded in 2017, the team is owned by Mr. Kishore Maharjan and Ms. Srijana Joshi Maharjan.  They won the 2018 edition of the league defeating Bhairahawa Gladiators by 14 runs, under the leadership of captain Gyanendra Malla. , Raju Basnyat was the head coach for the franchise. The team was captained by Kushal Bhurtel in 2021 season.

Current squad

Records

References



Everest Premier League
Cricket in Nepal
2017 establishments in Nepal